Albert Samuel Nipper (born April 2, 1959) is an American former professional baseball player and coach. A right-handed pitcher, he appeared in 144 Major League games over seven seasons for the Boston Red Sox, Chicago Cubs and Cleveland Indians.

Major League Baseball playing career
Born in San Diego, Nipper grew up in Missouri, where he graduated from Hazelwood West High School and Truman State University in Kirkville (formerly Northeast Missouri State University). He was the Red Sox' eighth selection in the 1980 Major League Baseball draft.

But then a succession of injuries limited his success. He started 26 games for the 1986 Red Sox, posting a mediocre 10–12 win–loss record and 5.38 earned run average as Boston won the American League East Division title. He did not appear in the ALCS against the California Angels, but made two appearances on the mound for the Red Sox in the 1986 World Series against the New York Mets. Nipper started Game 4 on October 22 at Fenway Park and held the Mets scoreless through three innings, but in the fourth, he surrendered three runs, two on a home run by Gary Carter. Nipper righted himself after that inning and pitched through the sixth, but the three runs he allowed held up as the winning margin in a 6–2 New York victory. Then, in the winner-take-all Game 7 at Shea Stadium October 27, Nipper was called upon in relief as Boston's fifth pitcher of the contest. Entering in the eighth inning with the Mets leading 6–5, Nipper was ineffective. He retired only one batter and allowed three hits, including a lead-off home run to Darryl Strawberry and a run-scoring single to opposing pitcher Jesse Orosco, enabling the Mets to pad their lead to an insurmountable 8–5; they won the world championship one inning later.

Nipper was traded to the Cubs in a deal for closer Lee Smith after the 1987 season. He pitched in 22 games, 12 as a starter, for the Cubs in 1988, then missed the entire 1989 season recovering from elbow and knee injuries. On June 27, 1988, Nipper recorded the only save of his MLB career, retiring the final out of the game to preserve a 2-1 Cubs victory over the Phillies.

 He signed as a free agent with Cleveland in 1990; in a season spent mostly with the Triple-A Colorado Springs Sky Sox, Nipper won his final two MLB games in mid-season.

He then signed a minor league contract with his hometown St. Louis Cardinals in 1991, but was not called up from Triple-A. It was his final season as a pitcher.

In his 144 total major league regular-season games played (124 as a starting pitcher), he finished with a career record of 46–50 and a 4.52 earned run average in 797 innings pitched, with 381 strikeouts and 21 complete games. He allowed 846 hits and 303 bases on balls.  In his only postseason action, in the 1986 World Series, Nipper posted an 0–1 (7.11) record, allowing five runs, ten hits and two bases on balls in two games and 6 innings of work.

Coaching career

After his pitching career, Nipper became a major and minor league pitching coach and scout. He returned to the Red Sox in 1992 and served in a succession of coaching roles at the minor league level (1992–mid-1995, and 1997) and as pitching coach on the big league staff under Kevin Kennedy from mid-1995 through mid-1996. He became the roving minor league pitching instructor for the Texas Rangers, serving for three years (1998–2000), then joined the Kansas City Royals as MLB pitching coach in 2001 and 2002. Returning to the Red Sox as pitching coach of Class A Sarasota (2003–04) and then minor league pitching coordinator (2005), he was promoted to MLB bullpen coach in 2006, although he spent much of that season as the Red Sox' interim pitching coach because of the surgery-induced absence of Dave Wallace.  Then, from 2007 to 2011, he was a special assignment scout for the Red Sox, specializing in evaluating pitchers.

In 2012–13, Nipper was the minor league pitching coordinator of the Detroit Tigers and he spent 2014 as pitching coach of the Triple-A Toledo Mud Hens in the Tigers' system. In , he returned to the Royals' organization as the pitching coach of the Omaha Storm Chasers, their Triple-A affiliate.

References

External links

  
 
  

1959 births
Living people
Baseball coaches from California
Baseball players from San Diego
Baseball coaches from Missouri
Baseball players from Missouri
Boston Red Sox coaches
Boston Red Sox players
Boston Red Sox scouts
Bristol Red Sox players
Chicago Cubs players
Cleveland Indians players
Colorado Springs Sky Sox players
Kansas City Royals coaches
Louisville Redbirds players
Major League Baseball bullpen coaches
Major League Baseball pitchers
Major League Baseball pitching coaches
New Britain Red Sox players
Pawtucket Red Sox players
People from St. Louis County, Missouri
Truman Bulldogs baseball players
Winter Haven Red Sox players